Tsvetan Genchev Tsvetanov (born 8 April 1965) is a Bulgarian politician and former government official. A former security deputy mayor of Sofia, he was, until 2009, the chairman of the GERB party. On 8 July 2009, in the wake of the 2009 parliamentary election won by his party, he was specified by de facto party leader Boyko Borisov as future Minister of the Interior.

Tsvetanov subsequently broke with Borisov, after the latter had pressured him into resigning his leadership roles within the party when Tsvetanov became embroiled in a real estate corruption scandal. Tsvetanov later left the party and founded his on Republicans for Bulgaria alongside other GERB defectors.

Career 
Tsvetanov was born in Sofia and graduated from the National Sports Academy; he also has a post-graduate degree in law from the University of National and World Economy. Tsvetanov's education also includes counteraction to global terrorism and prevention of illegal automobile trafficking courses at the headquarters of the Policía Nacional in Madrid, Spain, a management course at the International Law Enforcement Academy in Roswell, New Mexico and a basic course at ILEA Budapest, Hungary, as well as law enforcement courses at the American FBI and Department of Homeland Security.

From 2001 to 2005, Tsvetanov was operative assistant to Boyko Borisov, Chief Secretary of the Ministry of the Interior, and director of the ministry's management department. He was a Ministry of the Interior official from 1987 to 2005 when he left the ministry together with Borisov, who has been accused of working with organized crime while holding this position. From GERB's establishment in 2006 to 2009, the party was chaired by Tsvetanov. This was because Borisov was not allowed to head GERB due to being the mayor of Sofia. Borisov remained, however, the party's informal leader and Tsvetanov is perceived as his closest associate.

From July 2009 to March 2013, Tsvetan Tsvetanov was Deputy Prime Minister and Minister of Interior of the Republic of Bulgaria in the first government of Boyko Borisov. During Tsvetanov's tenure as Minister of the Interior, some of the most notorious organized crime groups that terrorized Bulgarian society over the years were neutralized. The hit-and-run group “The Killers” were caught and sentenced to life in prison  and the kidnapping group “The Impudents” was sentenced to a total of 444 years in prison.
Tsvetanov also successfully developed bilateral police cooperation with Bulgaria's NATO and EU partners throughout this time. In 2013, the US Drug Enforcement Agency – DEA opened an office in Sofia. Personally, the director of the agency, Michelle Lionhart, gives a high assessment of Tsvetanov's work:"Your dedication to your work has undoubtedly contributed to the rule of law and made both the Republic of Bulgaria and the United States a safer place for the citizens of both countries".
For excellent international police cooperation, Tsvetanov was also awarded Spain's highest award in the field of law enforcement – the Silver Cross for Civil Merit of the Civil Guard of Spain. The award was presented to him by Spain's Minister of Interior, Jorge Fernández Díaz, at an official ceremony.
For successful joint law enforcement operations with the Italian Carabinieri, Tsvetanov was awarded the title of Honorary Member of the Carabinieri Association.
Undoubtedly, the most difficult moment for Tsvetanov as a Minister of Interior was the Burgas bombing on July 18, 2012, in which five Israeli and one Bulgarian citizen died. Thanks to the investigation of the Bulgarian law enforcement authorities and the law-enforcement services of Israel, the USA, Canada, Australia, and Europol, the perpetrators of the terrorist act were identified and brought to court. The year after, on the 22nd of July 2013,  Tsvetan Tsvetanov played a decisive role in recognition of the military wing of Hezbollah as a terrorist organization.
Because of his significant role in the investigation of the attack in Burgas and the announcement of Hezbollah as the perpetrator of the attack, on February 18, 2013, 111 United States Congressmen sent a petition of thanks to Tsvetan Tsvetanov. "Your detailed and thorough investigation laid a solid foundation for further action against Hezbollah. In this regard, you can count on our support in the future as you take the next steps in this direction." 
Due to the systematic good work with the European Police Agency Europol, on September 25, 2018, Tsvetanov was elected as a permanent representative in the Management Board of Europol, in the Joint Group for Parliamentary Control of the agency.

Tsvetan Tsvetanov was the Chairman of the Standing Parliamentary Committee on Internal Security and Public Order in the 44th National Assembly 

He was a Member of Parliament in the 41st National Assembly (Parliament), 42nd National Assembly, 43rd National Assembly, and 44th National Assembly.

Scandals and charges

Real estate scandal 
Tsvetanov's image was first tainted in 2011 when media stories appeared of him owning several expensive properties in the capital city. An audit by the Tax Administration revealed he owns 6 apartments, something which no person in the public administration can easily afford. He offered unconvincing explanations of how he acquired six apartments in Sofia after entering politics in 2006, claiming they were bought by his mother-in-law. The tax case was re-opened in June 2013 after new evidence emerged that two of the apartments may have been given to him as a present in exchange for a lucrative government contract.

Wiretapping scandal 
In May 2013 Tsvetanov was indicted on two charges of wiretapping members of the GERB government and parliamentary deputies. In a television interview former agriculture minister Miroslav Naydenov confirmed the charges, describing instances when the wiretapping occurred. Tsvetanov has denied the claims by the general prosecutor, even though three members of the wiretapping unit at the Interior Ministry have independently confirmed them. A further charge on obstruction of justice was added in July 2013.

Charges of embezzlement 
Tsvetanov was charged with embezzling BGN 50000 from the Budget of the Ministry of Interior. "The sum was allegedly embezzled to the benefit of another person, Orlin Todorov, former head of the anti-mafia unit in Veliko Tarnovo." He was jailed for four years.

Apartment scandal and resignation 
In a scandal Bulgarian media dubbed "ApartmentGate", two NGOs broke a story in 2019 about several government officials, including Tsvetanov and their involvement in alleged corruption deals. Tsvetanov was said to have accepted a luxury apartment in a high-end building at less than a third of its market price. This coincided with the passage of several important pieces of legislation by the ruling party, which allowed the same company that provided the apartments to construct a 30-story skyscraper in one of Sofia's most prestigious neighbourhoods. The Bulgarian prosecution office refused to investigate the claims, saying it that an inquiry found that there was no evidence that Tsvetanov was taking part in corruption or other forms of crime.

Nevertheless, Tsvetanov was pressured into resigning his positions in the party by GERB leader Boyko Borisov and was demoted to an ordinary party member.

Formation of political party 
In June 2020, Tsvetanov announced that he had left GERB entirely and would instead be forming his own political party. He stated that he had broken his contacts with Borisov and retained no relationship with him, adding that Borisov's government had caused "inconsistency and chaos". He did so later that year, founding the Republicans for Bulgaria party, which he claimed would become "subject to repressions" by Borisov's government. The party was primarily staffed by other GERB defectors, along with some defectors from other right-wing political parties.

Personal life 
Tsvetanov is married to Desislava and has three daughters - Gergana,  Vasilena and Sofia.

References

1965 births
Living people
Bulgarian conservatives
Bulgarian police officers
Bulgarian politicians convicted of crimes
Deputy prime ministers of Bulgaria
GERB politicians
Government ministers of Bulgaria
Politicians from Sofia